Bu-Ba-Bu is a literary performance group founded on April 17, 1985 in Lviv by three Ukrainian writers Yuri Andrukhovych, Viktor Neborak, and Oleksandr Irvanets. The group's three syllables stand for "burlesque, balagan, and buffonada". The idea behind the group's formation was in order to present a carnival like interpretation of events in Ukraine.

The first public evening of Bu-Ba-Bu took place in late 1987 in Kyiv. The period of the most active activity of Bu-Ba-Bu (23 concert poetry evenings) was 1987–1991.

The apotheosis of Bu-Ba-Bu was the Vyvykh-92 festival in 1992 (youth festival of alternative culture and non-traditional genres of art in Lviv). The brightest part of the festival were four performances of 1–4 October 1992, poetry opera Chrysler Imperial by Bu-Ba-Bu (directed by S. Proskurnia).

In 1995, the first joint book of bubabists Bu-Ba-Bu. T.v.o.[…]ry was printed in the publishing house "Kamenyar".

In 1996, the Chrysler Imperial (Thursday-6) print project effectively ended the "dynamic period" of Bu-Ba-Bu's existence.

Bu-Ba-Bu Academy 
Bu-Ba-Bu Academy unites Bu-Ba-Bu members and poets awarded theBu-Ba-Bu Award for "Best Poem of the Year":

 Ivan Malkovych (1988)
 Nazar Gonchar (1989)
 Vihta Sad (1990)
 Volodymyr Tsybulko (1991)
 Mykhailo Barbara (1992)
 Olena Buyevich (1993)
 Petro Midyanka (1994)
 Mykola Kholodny (1995)
 Halyna Petrosanyak (1996)
 Yurko Pozayak (1997)
 Serhiy Zhadan (1999)

References

Theatre in Ukraine